The Pollupalai and Vallimunai Wind Farms are two wind farms built together by Joule Power and Beta Power, on the north-eastern shore of the Jaffna Lagoon, in Pachchilaipalli, Sri Lanka. The wind farms are the first-ever to be constructed in the Northern Province of Sri Lanka.

Wind turbines 

See also 

 Electricity in Sri Lanka

References

External links 
 

Wind farms in Sri Lanka
Buildings and structures in Kilinochchi District